Kellamäe mäy refer to several places in Estonia:

Kellamäe, Lääne-Viru County, village in Rakke Parish, Lääne-Viru County
Kellamäe, Saare County, village in Kaarma Parish, Saare County
Kellämäe, village in Rõuge Parish, Võru County

See also
Kallemäe, village in Valjala Parish, Saare County